Aveiro may refer to:
 Aveiro, Pará, a municipality in Brazil
 Aveiro, Portugal, a city and municipality in Portugal
 Região de Aveiro, surrounding the city above
 Aveiro District, surrounding the municipality above
 Roman Catholic Diocese of Aveiro, surrounding the city above
 Aveiro Lagoon (Ria de Aveiro), near the city above
 Aveiro Light, at the entrance to the lagoon above

People
 Dukes of Aveiro, an aristocratic Portuguese title, granted in 1535
 Cristiano Ronaldo dos Santos Aveiro (born 1985), Portuguese footballer
 Kátia Aveiro (born 1977), Portuguese singer
 José Aveiro (born 1936), Paraguayan footballer

Portuguese-language surnames